NA-21 Mardan-I is a constituency for the National Assembly of Pakistan. The constituency was formerly known as NA-11 (Mardan-III) from 1977 to 2018. The name changed to NA-20 (Mardan-I) after the delimitation in 2018 and to NA-21 (Mardan-I) after the delimitation in 2022.

Members of Parliament

1977–2002: NA-11 Mardan-III

2002–2018: NA-11 Mardan-III

2018-2022: NA-20 Mardan-I

Elections since 2002

2002 general election

A total of 1,757 votes were rejected.

2008 general election

A total of 495 votes were rejected.

2013 general election

A total of 3,970 votes were rejected.

2018 general election 

General elections were held on 25 July 2018.

By-election 2023 
A by-election will be held on 19 March 2023 due to the resignation of Mujahid Ali, the previous MNA from this seat.

See also
NA-20 Swabi-II
NA-22 Mardan-II

References

External links 
 Election result's official website

20
20